Malynivka is an urban-type settlement in Chuhuiv Raion of Kharkiv Oblast in Ukraine. It is located on the right bank of the Donets. Malynivka hosts the administration of Malynivka settlement hromada, one of the hromadas of Ukraine. Population:

Economy

Transportation
Malynivka railway station is on the railway connecting Kharkiv and Kupiansk-Vuzlovyi. There is passenger traffic.

The settlement has road access to Highway M03 connecting Kharkiv and Sloviansk.

References

Urban-type settlements in Chuhuiv Raion